Maltepe station is located in Maltepe, İstanbul. The station has 2 platforms for passenger traffic. The Haydarpaşa-Gebze Line and the Haydarpaşa-Adapazarı Regional service the station, as intercity trains skip Maltepe. The station was originally opened in 1872 by the Ottoman Government as part of a railway from İstanbul to İzmit. The government sold the station to the Anatolian Railway in 1888, which was later taken over by the Turkish State Railways in 1927. The station used to be a main freight depot, but when the branch line serving the Maltepe military pier was abandoned freight operations declined greatly.

External links
 Maltepe station information
 Adapazarı regional train timetables
 Eastbound Haydarpaşa commuter service
 Westbound Haydarpaşa commuter service

Railway stations in Istanbul Province
Railway stations opened in 1872
1872 establishments in the Ottoman Empire
Maltepe, Istanbul